Karovići may refer to:

 Karovići (Trnovo)
 Karovići (Čajniče)
 Karovići (Goražde)